St. Peter's Catholic High School is located in the Orrell area of Wigan, Greater Manchester, and caters for students from the ages of 11 to 16. Formed in 1960, it is one of the few Catholic comprehensive schools in the Wigan area.

St. Peter's has three main buildings: Main Build, the New Build and the Sports hall.

References

External links

Educational institutions established in 1960
Secondary schools in the Metropolitan Borough of Wigan
Catholic secondary schools in the Archdiocese of Liverpool
1960 establishments in England
Voluntary aided schools in England